The International Conservation Caucus Foundation (ICCF) is a non-partisan 501(c)(3) educational foundation based in Washington, D.C. ICCF's stated mission is "to advance U.S. leadership in international conservation through public and private partnerships and to develop the next generation of conservation leaders in the U.S. Congress."

The ICCF works with the leadership of the bipartisan U.S. Congressional International Conservation Caucus (ICC) to educate policymakers on issues that increase the effectiveness of government support for international conservation projects. The organization provides balanced information to Members of Congress through briefings and organizes educational programs by international conservation leaders in the corporate, government, and NGO communities.

Partners
The ICCF's Conservation Council Partners include:

3M
Abbott Fund
African Wildlife Foundation
Amata Foundation
American Petroleum Institute
AREVA
Association of Zoos & Aquariums
Autodesk
Barclays Capital
Cheetah Conservation Fund
Corporate Council on Africa
El Paso Corporation
Exxon Mobil
Food & Agriculture Organization of the United Nations
Fort Worth Zoo
Friends of Conservation/(A&K Philanthropy)
Global Environment Facility
Hewlett-Packard
Hertz
International League of Conservation Photographers
International Paper
JPMorgan Chase
Kraft Foods
Myriad Marketing
National Geographic Society
Panthera
PG&E
Prudential Financial
Qualcomm
Rainforest Alliance
RARE
Rare Species Fund
Ringling Bros. and Barnum & Bailey
Safari Club International Foundation
Save China's Tigers
SeaWorld Parks & Entertainment
Starbucks
Tara Wildlife
The Coca-Cola Company
The Dow Chemical Company
The Nature Conservancy
The WILD Foundation
Tudor Investment Corporation
Unilever
United Nations Foundation
Vodacom Foundation
Volkswagen Group of America
Walmart
Wilderness Foundation
Wildlife Conservation Society
World Wildlife Fund

Controversy
In an extensive March/April 2013 article in Mother Jones magazine, "The Congressman, the Safari King, and the Woman Who Tried to Look Like a Cat," author Corbin Hiar pointed out appearances of impropriety among ICCF's educational travel to Africa and elsewhere, including evidence that such trips were not properly reported on lobbying reports as required by law. The article also spotlights ICCF's unwillingness to take a public stand on global warming, the Lacey Act, or other issues that might threaten economic interests of ICCF's corporate members. In a separate interview, ICCF Founder and former President David Barron was also profiled for his business dealings with African political leadership, including the governments of Nigeria and other states during periods of autocratic or dictatorial governments.

Programs

U.S. Congressional Briefing Series
ICCF hosts educational programs with expert presenters on topics coordinated by conservationists' recommendations and concerns. Briefings focus on the direct connection between support of intelligent management of natural resources globally and benefits to U.S. national and economic security. Focal topic areas include oceans, forestry, and agriculture.

Awards
ICCF offers four major awards:
 The ICCF Teddy Roosevelt® International Conservation Award is presented to government leaders who demonstrate innovative leadership in conservation policy. Notable recipients have included: Rob Portman, Tony Blair, Jens Stoltenberg, Gloria Macapagal Arroyo, Prince Albert II of Monaco, Russell Train, the Great Green Wall Initiative, H.E. Lt. General Seretse Khama Ian Khama, King Charles III, and Felipe Calderón.
 ICCF Conservation Leadership in Business Award, which recognizes leaders who use business to inspire solutions to conservation challenges. Notable recipients have included: DuPont, Yvon Chouinard, National Geographic Society, Unilever, and Bumble Bee Foods.
 ICCF's "Good Steward" Award" is presented to individuals who have demonstrated outstanding leadership in conservation. Notable recipients have included: Ed Norton, Kris and Doug Tompkins, Harrison Ford, Rob Walton, and Bo Derek.
 The ICCF Lifetime Achievement Award recognizes individuals who have demonstrated a lifelong commitment to environmental preservation and restoration. Notable recipients have included: Stewart Udall and Magalen O. "Maggie" Bryant.

Oceans Caucus Foundation
A thematic focus on oceans resource management in ICCF's U.S. Congressional Briefing Series developed into its own program and later a separate 501(c)(3) entity - the Oceans Caucus Foundation - as a means to specifically address the conservation needs of coastal ecosystems, and to focus on preserving and cultivating the economic value oceans have for communities and the global economy.

Conservation Council of Nations
In May 2011 the ICCF launched the Conservation Council of Nations (CCN) as an international network of conservation-focused public and private sector leaders to foster new conservation caucuses modeled after the U.S. International Conservation Caucus and the education-centric foundations to support these legislative caucuses.

The CCN's mission, as stated on their website, is to build "the world's strongest network of policymakers, corporations, and NGOs to promote the efficient and beneficial use of natural resources and effective transnational conservation solutions, including through its Natural Resource Wealth Management™ program and initiatives."

See also
 United States Congressional International Conservation Caucus

References

External links 
 ICC Foundation web site
 Mother Jones article, "The Congressman, the Safari King, and the Woman Who Tried to Look Like a Cat"

Nature conservation organizations based in the United States
Non-profit organizations based in Washington, D.C.
Educational organizations based in the United States
International sustainability organizations
Organizations established in 2006